This is the complete list of Pan American Games medalists in swimming for both men and women. Swimming has been a part of the Pan American Games since the Games' first edition in 1951.

Men's events

50 m freestyle

100 m freestyle

200 m freestyle

400 m freestyle

800 m freestyle

1500 m freestyle

100 m backstroke

200 m backstroke

100 m breaststroke

200 m breaststroke

100 m butterfly

200 m butterfly

200 m individual medley

400 m individual medley

4×100 m freestyle

4×200 m freestyle

4×100 m medley

* The 1951 event was not a 4×100m but a 3×100m medley relay

10 km marathon

Women's events

50 m freestyle

100 m freestyle

200 m freestyle

400 m freestyle

800 m freestyle

1500 m freestyle

100 m backstroke

200 m backstroke

100 m breaststroke

200 m breaststroke

100 m butterfly

200 m butterfly

200 m individual medley

400 m individual medley

4×100 m freestyle

4×200 m freestyle

4×100 m medley

* The 1951 event was not a 4×100 m but a 3×100 m medley relay

10 km marathon

See also
 Swimming at the Pan American Games

References
 USA Swimming
 Results
 Swim Rankings Results 2007

Pan American Games
Medalists
Swimming